Echinoecus is a genus of crabs that live in association with sea urchins. Formerly considered monotypic, the genus is now thought to contain three species:
Echinoecus nipponicus Miyake, 1939 – Japan, on Heliocidaris crassispina (Echinometridae) and Pseudocentrotus depressus (Strongylocentrotidae)
Echinoecus pentagonus (A. Milne-Edwards, 1879) – East Africa and Red Sea to Hawaii and French Polynesia, on Diadema savignyi, D. setosum, Echinothrix calamaris and E. diadema (Diadematidae),  Heterocentrotus mammillatus (Echinometridae) and Pseudocentrotus depressus (Strongylocentrotidae)
Echinoecus sculptus (Ward, 1934) – Christmas Island, on Colobocentrotus atratus (Echinometridae)

References

Pilumnoidea
Taxa named by Mary J. Rathbun